Auchnagatt railway station was a railway station in Auchnagatt, Aberdeenshire. Before its closure, services ran to Fraserburgh, Peterhead and Aberdeen.

History
The station was opened  by the Formartine and Buchan Railway, then part of the Great North of Scotland Railway. It became part of the London and North Eastern Railway during the Grouping of 1923, and then passed on to the Scottish Region of British Railways during the nationalisation of 1948. It was then closed to passengers by the British Railways Board in 1965 under the Beeching Axe. It stayed open for goods until 28 March 1966.

The site today
The station is still fairly intact beside the lifted railway. One platform still remains.

References

 
 
 Station on navigable O.S. map

External links
RAILSCOT on Formartine and Buchan Railway

Disused railway stations in Aberdeenshire
Railway stations in Great Britain opened in 1861
Railway stations in Great Britain closed in 1965
Beeching closures in Scotland
Former Great North of Scotland Railway stations
1861 establishments in Scotland
1965 disestablishments in Scotland